Chalcodermus is a genus of snout and bark beetles in the family Curculionidae. There are at least 110 described species in Chalcodermus.

See also
 List of Chalcodermus species

References

Further reading

 
 
 
 
 
 
 

Molytinae
Articles created by Qbugbot